Orientalicesa is a small Indomalayan genus of potter wasps.

Taxonomy 
The genus was first described under the name Kennethia by Antonio Giordani Soika, who misspelled the name as Kennetia in his original description of the genus. As the name was already preoccupied by Kennethia De Deckker, 1979, a species of crustacean in the family Notodromadidae, the replacement name of Orientalicesa was designated by Koçak and Kemal in 2010.

Species

References

Hymenoptera genera
Potter wasps